Greenbush Branch is a stream in Walker County, in the U.S. state of Georgia.

Greenbush Branch was named after the green bush on a settler's property.

See also
List of rivers of Georgia (U.S. state)

References

Rivers of Walker County, Georgia
Rivers of Georgia (U.S. state)